Louis Armstrong Stadium is a 14,000-seat tennis stadium at the USTA Billie Jean King National Tennis Center in New York City, one of the venues of the US Open. It opened for the 2018 US Open as a replacement for the 1978 stadium of the same name. It is named after jazz musician Louis Armstrong who lived nearby until his death in 1971.

Features
The stadium has a retractable roof, the largest of its kind among the No. 2 stadiums at Grand Slam venues. At the time of its opening it was the 13th largest tennis venue in the world (based on capacity). It is the first tennis stadium to have a roof and be naturally ventilated. Designers say the terra cotta material contextually relates to the traditional brick buildings on the site while using the material in a new way.

The stadium has two levels: The lower bowl has 6,400 reserved seats, and the cantilevered upper bowl has over 7,000 unreserved seats.

History

Construction
The former Louis Armstrong Stadium was demolished following the 2016 US Open. For the 2017 tournament, while construction was still ongoing on the new stadium, a temporary 8,800-seat stadium was built on the site of the demolished ticket office and East Gate entrance, on Parking Lot B, close to the boardwalk ramp to the subway and LIRR trains.

Opening
The stadium was opened on August 22, 2018, when John and Patrick McEnroe played an exhibition against James Blake and Michael Chang. The first official match was played during the US Open on August 27, 2018, between Simona Halep and Kaia Kanepi. Kanepi won in two sets, which was the first time a WTA No. 1 had lost in the first round of the US Open.

References

2018 establishments in New York City
21st century in Queens
Flushing Meadows–Corona Park
Louis Armstrong
Retractable-roof stadiums in the United States
Sports venues completed in 2018
Sports venues in Queens, New York
Tennis venues in New York City
Outdoor arenas
US Open (tennis)